Beryl Gaffney (born April 1, 1930) is a Canadian former politician and public servant. She served as a city councillor in Nepean, Ontario from 1978 to 1988 serving concurrently on the council of the Regional Municipality of Ottawa-Carleton.

Born in Summerside, Prince Edward Island, she was elected to the House of Commons of Canada as the Liberal MP for Nepean in the 1988 federal election and was re-elected in 1993 and served as chair of the Standing Committee on Human Rights and the Status of Disabled Persons from 1994 to 1996. During this period she was diagnosed with a brain tumour and, after successful surgery, was able to return to the House of Commons to resume her valuable contribution to health issues.  She did not run for re-election in 1997.

In 1998, Gaffney was appointed to the Board of Governors of the International Development Research Centre by Foreign Minister Lloyd Axworthy.

References

External links
 

1930 births
Living people
Members of the House of Commons of Canada from Ontario
Liberal Party of Canada MPs
Politicians from Ottawa
People from Summerside, Prince Edward Island
Women members of the House of Commons of Canada
Ontario municipal councillors
Women municipal councillors in Canada
Women in Ontario politics
Ottawa-Carleton regional councillors